Girne District is one of six districts of Northern Cyprus. It is divided between two sub-districts: Girne Sub-district and the Çamlıbel Sub-district. Its capital is Kyrenia, also known by its Turkish name, as Girne. Its population was  73,577 in the 2011 census. Its Governor is Mehmet Envergil. It has the same boundaries as the Kyrenia District of Cyprus, a distinct political entity and local government-in-exile which claims the same territory. Girne District is the only district of the Cyprus that is fully taken by Northern Cyprus.

See also
 Districts of Cyprus
Districts of Northern Cyprus

References

 
Districts of Northern Cyprus